Someday or Some Day may refer to:

Film and television 
 Someday (1935 film), a British film directed by Michael Powell
 Someday (2011 film), a Japanese film directed by Junji Sakamoto
 Someday (2021 film), an Indian Hindi-language short film directed by Shefali Shah
 Some Day (TV series), a 2010 Hong Kong sitcom
 Someday (TV series), a 2006 South Korean drama
 Someday, a 2013 South Korean streaming TV series on Naver TV
 "Someday...", an episode of The Marvelous Mrs. Maisel

Literature 
 "Someday" (short story), a 1956 story by Isaac Asimov
 Someday, a 2018 novel by David Levithan

Music

Albums 
 Someday (Crystal Gayle album) or the title song, 1995
 Someday (J-Walk album) or the title song, 2002
 Someday (Susanna Hoffs album), 2012
 Someday (Yanni album) or the title song (see below), 1999
 Someday (Younha album), 2008
 Someday... (album), by Cindy Blackman, 2001
 Someday, by Arlo Guthrie, 1986
 Someday, by Frank Carillo & The Bandoleros, 2008

Songs 
 "Some Day" (1925 song), written by Rudolf Friml and Brian Hooker for The Vagabond King; covered by Frankie Laine, 1954
 "Someday" (Alan Jackson song), 1991
 "Someday" (Alcazar song), 2003
 "Someday" (CeCe Rogers song), 1987
 "Someday?" (Concrete Blonde song), 1992
 "Someday" (Disney song), from The Hunchback of Notre Dame, 1996
 "Someday" (Flipsyde song), 2005
 "Someday" (Glass Tiger song), 1986
 "Someday" (Julian Lennon song), 2013
 "Someday" (Kygo and Zac Brown song), 2020
 "Someday" (M People song), 1992
 "Someday" (Mariah Carey song), 1990
 "Someday" (Michael Learns to Rock song), 1995
 "Someday" (Nickelback song), 2003
 "Someday" (Nina Girado song), 2006
 "Someday" (No Angels song), 2003
 "Someday" (Rob Thomas song), 2009
 "Someday" (Steve Earle song), from Guitar Town, 1986
 "Someday" (The Strokes song), 2002
 "Someday" (Sugar Ray song), 1999
 "Someday" (Vince Gill song), 2003
 "Someday (I Will Understand)", by Britney Spears, 2005
 "Someday (I'm Coming Back)", by Lisa Stansfield, 1992
 "Someday (Place in the Sun)", by Tinie Tempah, 2013
 "Someday (You'll Want Me to Want You)", written by Jimmie Hodges, 1944; covered by many artists
 "Someday"/"Boys & Girls", by Kumi Koda, 2006
 "Someday", by the Afters from I Wish We All Could Win
 "Someday", by Ash from Free All Angels
 "Someday", by the Black Eyed Peas from The Beginning
 "Someday", by Brian Houston from Sugar Queen
 "Someday", by the Carpenters from Ticket to Ride
 "Someday", by Cold Chisel from Blood Moon
 "Someday", by Crossfade from Falling Away
 "Someday", by Crystal Gayle from Someday
 "Someday", by David Gates from Never Let Her Go
 "Someday", by Embrace from Out of Nothing
 "Someday", by Emyli
 "Someday", by Enuff Z'Nuff from Paraphernalia
 "Someday", by GFriend from Snowflake
 "Someday", by Greg Kihn Band from Kihnspiracy
 "Someday", by John Legend
 "Someday", by Ké
 "Someday", by Keisha White, theme song from the TV series The Story of Tracy Beaker
 "Someday", by Kylie Minogue from Body Language
 "Someday", by Lesley Gore from Ever Since
 "Someday", by LP from Forever for Now
 "Someday", by Michael Bublé from Nobody but Me
 "Someday", by Michael W. Smith from I'll Lead You Home
 "Someday", by Mike Errico
 "Someday", by Moby Grape from Moby Grape
 "Someday", by Naaz from Bits of Naaz
 "Someday", by Neil Young from Freedom
 "Someday", by OneRepublic from Human
 "Someday", by Project Rocket from the split EP Project Rocket / Fall Out Boy
 "Someday", by Ray Charles
 "Some Day", by Shinedown from Us and Them
 "Someday", by Silent Poets
 "Someday", by Slinkee Minx
 "Someday", by Tegan and Sara from Sainthood
 "Someday", by Two Door Cinema Club from Beacon
 "Someday", by U-KISS from Neverland
 "Someday", by Ween from Shinola, Vol. 1
 "Someday", by Yanni from Niki Nana
 "Someday", by Zebrahead from Waste of Mind
 "Someday", from the film Zombies 3
 "Someday", from the musical Memphis
 "Someday (August 29, 1968)", by Chicago from The Chicago Transit Authority

See also 
 "Someday, Someday", a song by Thirsty Merc
 Somedays (disambiguation)
 Sumday, an album by Grandaddy